The Kowloon East geographical constituency was one of the five geographical constituencies in the Legislative Council of Hong Kong from 1998 to 2021. It was established in 1998 for the first SAR Legislative Council election and was abolished under the 2021 overhaul of the Hong Kong electoral system. In the 2016 Legislative Council election, it elected five members of the Legislative Council using the Hare quota of party-list proportional representation. The constituency corresponded to the today's districts of Wong Tai Sin and Kwun Tong.

History

The single-constituency single-vote system was replaced by the proportional representation system for the first SAR Legislative Council election designed by Beijing to reward the weaker pro-Beijing candidates and dilute the electoral strength of the majority pro-democrats. Three seats were allocated to Kowloon East, with the Democratic Party taking two seats, represented by Szeto Wah and Fred Li and the pro-Beijing Democratic Alliance for the Betterment of Hong Kong (DAB) taking one seat, represented by Chan Yuen-han.

In the 2000 Legislative Council election, one more seat were allocated to Kowloon East. The DAB ticket was able to win two seats with Chan Yuen-han's popularity carried Chan Kam-lam through, with the popular votes even exceeding the Democratic ticket. One more seat was added in the 2004 election, where former pro-democracy radio host Albert Cheng swept the votes with nearly a quarter of the vote share, while pro-democracy barrister Alan Leong also won a seat, replacing Szeto Wah who was retiring.

The constituency was reduced to four seats due to the reapportionment in the 2008 Legislative Council election. With Albert Cheng stepping down from the office, the seats were divided by Chan Kam-lam of the DAB , Wong Kwok-kin of the Hong Kong Federation of Trade Unions (FTU) who was succeeding Chan Yuen-han, Fredi Li of the Democratic Party and Alan Leong of the Civic Party. Leong resigned from the legislature to launch the "Five Constituencies Referendum" in 2010 to pressure the government over the 2012 constitutional reform proposal, but was re-elected with a low turnout due to the government and pro-Beijing boycott.

Kowloon East was given back five seats in the 2012 Legislative Council election, with an extra seat being fought for between pro-Beijing independent Paul Tse and two radical democrats, Andrew To of the League of Social Democrats (LSD) and Wong Yeung-tat of the People Power. Tse eventually took the last seat with a thin margin due to the pro-democracy infighting, making the pro-Beijing camp winning the majority of the seats for the first time. The balance of power remained unchanged in the 2016 election, with Wu Chi-wai taking the torch from Fred Li one term earlier, and Wilson Or and Jeremy Tam succeeding Chan Kam-lam and Alan Leong respectively.

Returned members
The following lists the members since the creation of the Kowloon East constituency. The number of seats allocated to Kowloon East varied between three and five between 1998 and 2016 due to reapportionment.

Summary of seats won

Vote share summary

Election results
The largest remainder method (with Hare quota) of the proportional representative electoral system was introduced in 1998, replacing the single-member constituencies of the 1995 election. Elected candidates are shown in bold. Brackets indicate the quota + remainder.

2010s

2000s

1990s

See also
List of constituencies of Hong Kong

References

New Kowloon
Constituencies of Hong Kong
Constituencies of Hong Kong Legislative Council
1998 establishments in Hong Kong
Constituencies established in 1998
2021 disestablishments in Hong Kong
Constituencies disestablished in 2021